Shelby Robertson is an American comic book illustrator, known for his distinctive style pinup renditions of attractive fictional female characters. His detailed rendering of heavily muscled figures has been compared to that of Frank Frazetta and Michael Turner. He describes his style as "part Marvel, part DC, and part old school Image".

Early life
Shelby Robertson had no formal art training. His biggest influence is British artist Alan Davis, in particular Davis' work on Excalibur in the late 1980s and early 1990s. Robertson elaborates that it was not Davis' style that he wished to emulate, but that seeing his work inspired him to want to draw for a living. In terms of artists whose work he emulates, he acknowledges that his work appears heavily influenced by Michael Turner, Arthur Adams, Jim Lee, Marc Silvestri, and Frank Frazetta, all of whom he is a fan, and also mentions Travis Charest and Terry Dodson.

Career
Robertson's art career started in 1993, at the age of 15, when he was hired by the British Aeronautics Magazine as a lead artist and concept illustrator. He was commissioned by Rob Liefeld at the age of 17, and his first submission pin-up became his first published work in the industry. He did Rascal from the Black Flag comic serialized tale and after a few months, was permitted to do his own book, "Crypt and tons of fill in pagework". He also helped out with many "ghost" inks and was often used as a background assistant to seasoned veteran comic book artists.
 
Since leaving Extreme Studios in 1996, he has worked on a number of different titles for different publishers. He has also done work for the music industry, including layout and pre-press production for Glenn Danzig, Bloodhound Gang, Agent 51 Adeline Records, Box Of Stuff, and Kidd Nasty.

Shelby worked in the VideoGames industry full-time from 2012 - 2014 as a character designer, portrait painter, and asset designer on several online PC games including asset design freelance. In 2016 and part of 2017, Shelby provided ink finished work on the Deadpool trade paperback titled Bad Blood with pencils supplied by Deadpool creator Rob Liefeld. Shelby is also providing artwork for upcoming Extreme relaunch titles, tbd. Shelby is also providing artwork for 2017 installments of 94 and Madam Satan American Dischord properties.

Awards
2011 Phoenix New Times Best Comic Book Artist Award

Partial bibliography
 1993 - 1995 British Aeronautics Journal, British Aeronautics Magazine, Aeros Worldwide AutoCAD Designer
 1995 - Early 1998 Image Comics: Crypt 1; Chapel 3; Badrock Fan Magazine; Prophet Chromium Trading Cards
 1996 Maximum Press: Black Flag 0; Black Flag 4; Avengelyne Swimsuit 1
 1996 Malibu Press Prime Penciler *9 issue run cancelled due to Marvel Comics purchase of the West Coast publishing house
 1996 - 1997 Entity Comics: Fem 5 1 - 5; Fem 5 Untold 1; Stargate 1 - 2; Krusada 1
 1997 - 1999 London Night Studios: Morbid Angel 1 - 3; Razor (Various Covers, Trading Cards, and Poster Arts)
 1998 Verotik: Albino Spider of Dajette 0 Artist; Satanika 1 - 3 Artist; Verotik Halloween Cards Dalkiel 1 Inker
 1999 - 2003 Anelektrix Entertainment: Latex Alice 0 - 3; NVN 0; Forever Realms 1; Darkshrine 1 - 4
 2004 - 2012 American Dischord: Latex Alice 1; S-Unit 0; Shelby Robertson Sketchbook Vol. 1
 2013 - Current American Dischord: Deadpool Bad Blood Inker; VexOps Colorist Cover Artist; Shelby Robertson Sketchbook Vol. 1 - Vol. 3 Artist; Madam Satan Co-Creator Penciler Inker Colorist, 94 Issues 1 through 3.5 Creator Writer Penciler Inker Cover Colorist, 94 Series 2 Creator Writer Penciler Inker

References

External links

 American Dischord

American comics artists
Living people
Year of birth missing (living people)